, also known as Dengeki Gao! was a Japanese shōnen manga magazine that primarily contained manga and information about series featuring bishōjo characters. It was published from December 1992 to February 2008 by MediaWorks. The Gao in the magazine's title is a childish form of the sound Grr. Many manga serialized in Dengeki Comic Gao! were adapted from light novels published under MediaWorks' Dengeki Bunko label. The magazine was sold every month on the twenty-seventh.

When Dengeki Comic Gao! was first published, many of the manga that ran in the magazine had transferred from Kadokawa Shoten's Comic Comp magazine, though many of the titles were slightly altered. This caused the readers of Comic Comp to become interested in Dengeki Comic Gao! and in October 1994, Comic Comp ceased publication. Gradually, it became apparent that MediaWorks' similar manga magazine Dengeki Daioh was much more popular, and in response, Dengeki Comic Gao! was reformatted starting with the February 2007 issue on December 27, 2006. This was also when the Gao as printed on the magazine cover was changed from being spelled in katakana  to being spelled in English stylized as gao. On December 9, 2006, the first issue of a special edition version of Dengeki Comic Gao! called Comic Sylph was published, and is sold quarterly; starting with volume six, Comic Sylph became a special edition version of Dengeki Daioh on March 21, 2008.

The last issue, nicknamed , was sold on February 27, 2008 with most of the currently serialized titles reaching their final chapters, while some others continued publication in MediaWorks's similarly themed magazine Dengeki Daioh.

List of serialized titles

References

External links
Dengeki Comic Gao! official website 
MediaWorks' Dengeki Comic Gao! website 

 
1992 establishments in Japan
2008 disestablishments in Japan
Defunct magazines published in Japan
Magazines established in 1992
Magazines disestablished in 2008
Magazines published in Tokyo
Monthly manga magazines published in Japan
Shōnen manga magazines